Chersotis larixia is a moth of the family Noctuidae. It is found in Spain, France, Switzerland, Italy and Sicily, Crete, Turkey, and east to Armenia, Azerbaijan, Syria, Iran, Lebanon, and Turkmenistan. In Europe, it is found in mountainous regions, like the Pyrenees, the Alps, and the Maritime Alps, up to heights of 2,000 meters.

Description
The wingspan is about 38 mm. Warren (1914) states 
R  larixia Guen. Like elegans  Ev. but with all the markings, as it were, blurred and unconcise; slightly larger in size and occurring always at a higher elevation than that species, in Europe it is found in the Alps of S. France and N. Italy : and in the Mts. of Armenia, Persia, and W. Turkestan in Asia.

Subspecies
Chersotis larixia asiatica (Schwingenschuss, 1938) (Crete, Turkey, Iran)
Chersotis larixia larixia (Guenée, 1852) (south-western Europe)
Chersotis larixia erebina Boursin, 1940 (Azerbaijan, Iran, Russia)

Biology
Adults are on wing from June to August.

The larvae feed on various low-growing plants.

References

External links
Fauna Europaea
Species info
noctuidae.de

Noctuinae
Moths of Europe
Moths of Asia